The 2019 North Dakota State Bison football team represented North Dakota State University in the 2019 NCAA Division I FCS football season. They were led by first-year head coach Matt Entz. The team played in the Fargodome in Fargo, North Dakota, for the 27th season as members of the Missouri Valley Football Conference (MVFC). They entered the season as defending national champions, having won seven of the prior eight FCS titles. In 2019, the Bison finished the regular season 12–0, the second consecutive undefeated Bison season, and won their ninth consecutive MVFC title. They received an automatic qualifying bid to the FCS playoff tournament and were seeded as the No. 1 team. The Bison then went 4–0 in the FCS playoffs to finish 16–0 as FCS champions, becoming the first team at any level of college football to finish a season 16–0 since Yale in 1894. They also extended their FCS-record winning streak to 37 games.

Previous season

In 2018, the Bison finished the regular season 11–0, the first undefeated Bison season since the 2013 campaign, and won their 9th consecutive MVFC Title. They received an automatic qualifying bid to the FCS Playoff Tournament and were seeded as the No. 1 Team.  The Bison then went 4–0 in the FCS playoffs to finish 15–0 and FCS Champions.

Preseason

MVFC poll
In the MVFC preseason poll released on July 29, 2019, the Bison were predicted to finish in first place.

Preseason All–MVFC team
The Bison had six players selected to the preseason all-MVFC team.

Offense

Zack Johnson – OL

Dillon Radunz – OL

Defense

Derrek Tuszka – DL

Jabril Cox – LB

James Hendricks – DB

Garret Wegner – P

Schedule

Game summaries

vs. Butler

North Dakota

at Delaware

UC Davis

at Illinois State

Northern Iowa

Missouri State

at South Dakota State

at Youngstown State

Western Illinois

South Dakota

at Southern Illinois

FCS Playoffs
The Bison entered the postseason tournament as the number one seed, with a first-round bye.

Nicholls–Second Round

Illinois State–Quarterfinals

Montana State–Semifinals

vs. James Madison–Championship

Ranking movements
AP Poll

FCS polls

Players drafted into the NFL

References

North Dakota State
North Dakota State Bison football seasons
Missouri Valley Football Conference champion seasons
NCAA Division I Football Champions
North Dakota State
College football undefeated seasons
North Dakota State Bison football